Brad Anderson may refer to:

People
Brad Anderson (cartoonist) (1924–2015), American cartoonist most famous for creating the comic strip Marmaduke
Brad Anderson (director) (born 1964), American film director
Brad Anderson (wrestler) (born 1969), American professional wrestler
Brad Anderson (executive) (born 1949), vice chairman of Best Buy
Brad Anderson (motocross rider), British motocross rider
Brad Anderson (American football) (born 1961), American football player
Brad Anderson (racer), American drag racer in National Hot Rod Association championships
Brad Anderson (colorist), comic book contributor in X-Men: Deadly Genesis

Fictional characters
Brad Anderson, a character in the 1987 American teen comedy film Adventures in Babysitting